This is a list of games that were available for purchase on the Stadia cloud gaming service from Google, which has now been discontinued.

At the time of the service's shuttering in January 2023, there were  titles on this list.

References
Notes

Citations

Stadia
 
Stadia games